Pino Minafra (born 21 Juli 1951 in Ruvo di Puglia) is an Italian trumpeter and flugelhorn player who is associated with free improvisation, avant-garde jazz. A founding member of the Italian Instabile Orchestra, Minafra has recorded with such musicians as Gianluigi Trovesi, Mario Schiano, Han Bennink, Ernst Reijseger, Willem Breuker and Michel Godard.

Discography

As contributor

References

1951 births
Living people
Free improvising musicians
People from Ruvo di Puglia
Avant-garde jazz trumpeters
21st-century trumpeters
Italian Instabile Orchestra members
European Jazz Ensemble members